SSC Scam is an alleged paper leak scandal which was first reported by sections of media in 2018.  This alleged 'scam' was popularized when several students reported their assessment of a large scale paper leak, unfair assessment after normalisation and various other misgivings. The then SSC director rejected these assertions but CBI has arrested few people while the case continues.

Scams

Paper leak
The SSC exams are the only government exams with highest paper leak cases after 2016, every two or three years a new paper leak case arises.

References

21st-century scandals
Academic scandals 
Cover-ups
Scandals in India
2016 scandals
Political corruption in India
Employment in India
Confidence tricks
Criminal investigation
Deception
Financial scandals
Finance fraud
2016 in Indian politics
2016 in India